The 2017 NCAA Division I softball season, play of college softball in the United States organized by the National Collegiate Athletic Association (NCAA) at the Division I level, began in February 2017.  The season progressed through the regular season, many conference tournaments and championship series, and concluded with the 2017 NCAA Division I softball tournament and 2017 Women's College World Series.  The Women's College World Series, consisting of the eight remaining teams in the NCAA Tournament and held annually in Oklahoma City at ASA Hall of Fame Stadium, ended on June 4, 2017.

Conference standings

National Invitational Softball Championship

Liberty Flames defeated the Lamar Cardinals in the inaugural championship; Tori Zavodny was named MVP for the series.

Women's College World Series
The 2017 Women's College World Series began on June 1–4 in Oklahoma City.

Season leaders
Batting
Batting average: .487 – Kacie Burnett, Idaho State Bengals
RBIs: 82 – DJ Sanders, Louisiana Ragin' Cajuns
Home runs: 29 – DJ Sanders, Louisiana Ragin' Cajuns

Pitching
Wins: 38-3 – Megan Good, James Madison Dukes
ERA: 0.50 (14 ER/193.2 IP) – Kelly Barnhill, Florida Gators
Strikeouts: 412 – Megan Betsa, Michigan Wolverines

Records
NCAA Division I consecutive plate appearances reaching base:
26 – Amber Schisler, Campbell Fighting Camels; May 5–17, 2017

Freshman class single game RBIs:
10 – Braxton Burnside, Missouri Tigers; March 18, 2017

Awards
USA Softball Collegiate Player of the Year:
Kelly Barnhill, Florida Gators

Honda Sports Award Softball:
Kelly Barnhill, Florida Gators

espnW National Player of The Year:
Kelly Barnhill, Florida Gators

Best Female College Athlete ESPY Award
Kelly Barnhill, Florida Gators

NFCA National Player of the Year:
Megan Good, James Madison Dukes

NFCA National Freshman of the Year:
Rachel Garcia, UCLA Bruins

NFCA Catcher of the Year: 
Kendyl Lindaman, Minnesota

NFCA Golden Shoe Award: 
Elicia D'Orazio, Marshall

All America Teams
The following players were members of the All-American Teams.

First Team

Second Team

Third Team

References

External links